Texas State Technical College (TSTC) is a public community college with 10 campuses throughout Texas. TSTC is the State of Texas's only public multicampus technical college, offering associate degrees and certificates in technical skills and trades. TSTC's headquarters are located north of Waco and are co-located with the Waco campus, the oldest TSTC location and flagship location. TSTC also operates campuses in Harlingen, Marshall, Red Oak, Abilene, Breckenridge, Brownwood, Sweetwater, Williamson County, and Fort Bend County.

History
TSTC was established in 1965 as the James Connally Technical Institute (JCTI) of Texas A&M University to meet the state's evolving workforce needs.  At the time, Governor John Connally (no relation) predicted that it would be "the most sophisticated technical-vocational institute in the country."

In 1967, JCTI expanded to include a South Texas campus in Harlingen.

In 1969, the JCTI colleges separated from Texas A&M University and became an independent state system, with its own board of regents, taking the name Texas State Technical Institute.  Texas State Technical Institute-Waco (TSTI-Waco) was the first school in the United States to offer an associate of applied science degree in laser electro-optics technology.
The program began in September 1969. The name changed to its present one in 1991.

As the need for technical education increased in Texas, TSTC opened additional campuses in Amarillo (this campus later left TSTI to become part of Amarillo College) and Sweetwater in 1979, McAllen (1983, no longer part of the system), Abilene (1985), Breckenridge (1989), Brownwood (1991), and Marshall (1991;  became a separate college in 1999).

On September 1, 1999, the Marshall extension center was officially designated a stand-alone campus by the Texas Legislature, and it became known as Texas State Technical College Marshall.  In 2011, the Legislature redefined the TSTC West Texas campus as one that serves West Texas with four strategically positioned, permanent locations at Sweetwater, Abilene, Breckenridge, and Brownwood. In 2013, the Texas Legislature authorized the creation of an extension center in Ellis County creating TSTC Marshall North Texas Extension Center also known as TSTC North Texas.

In 2015, TSTC and the Greater Fort Bend Economic Development Council unveiled plans to build a permanent campus in Rosenberg. The grand opening was celebrated in the fall a year later, bringing manufacturing, engineering, and information technology programs to the community.

TSTC collaborates with educational partners from throughout Texas to bring additional educational options to students. TSTC has partnerships in Hutto and Richmond working closely with a number of universities, school districts, colleges, and other entities to help provide a strong workforce for the future of Texas.

Academics
TSTC is a technical college designed to provide vocational and technical education to people entering the workforce or in the midst of a career change.  As such, it primarily offers the associate of applied science (AAS) degree (along with certificates of completion).  In 2009, TSTC Harlingen received approval from the Texas Legislature and Texas Higher Education Coordinating Board to add associate of science (AS) degrees to its traditional offerings for those students desiring to transfer to a university or enter the workforce directly with an associate of science in biology, computer science, engineering, mathematics, physics, nursing preparatory, and health professions. Additionally, the Harlingen college began offering fields of study in combination with the academic core, which when transferred to a Texas public college or university, can substitute for freshman and sophomore major requirements.

Governance
The Texas State Technical College is governed by a nine-member board of regents and operated under the direction of a chancellor. These regents, who provide a statewide perspective, are appointed by the governor to six-year terms. The board meets quarterly to provide leadership and enact policies for the successful management and operation of the system. The colleges operate under the rules and regulations of the Texas Higher Education Coordinating Board. The Texas State Technical College Chancellor is Michael L. Reeser.

Campuses

Permanent campuses

Extension center
TSTC administers an extension center in partnership with Temple College at the East Williamson County Higher Education Center in Williamson County.

Accreditation
Texas State Technical College is accredited to award AAS degrees and certificates of completion by the Commission on Colleges of the Southern Association of Colleges and Schools. Students may review accreditation records in the Texas State Technical College Office of the Chancellor.  Texas State Technical College is a member of the American Association of Collegiate Registrars and Admissions Officers and is listed in that association's Report of Credit Given.

Rankings
Each year Community College Week publishes a special report on the top associate degree and certificate producers in the United States, considering the public, private nonprofit, and proprietary institutions of higher education that award two-year degrees and one- and two-year certificates.  All such institutions that are eligible for federal financial aid funds under Title IV legislation are considered.  Some data are reported by institution, while others are reported by system; TSTC is reported by institution.  The June 19, 2006 report was based on preliminary data for Academic Year 2004-2005.  According to the report:

 TSTC Harlingen was ranked among the top 20 colleges in Texas (ranked 73 nationally) in conferring associate degrees all disciplines to Hispanic graduates. 
 TSTC Waco was ranked:
 the top college in  Texas (ranked 45 nationally) in conferring associate degrees in agriculture, agricultural operations and related sciences 
 the second college in the state of Texas (ranked 12 nationally) in conferring associate degrees in engineering-related technologies/technicians 
 the second college in the state of Texas (ranked 21 nationally) in conferring associate degrees in computer and information sciences and support services
 the top college in  Texas (ranked 39 nationally) in conferring associate degrees in precision and production

Wind power
In response to the growing need for technical training involving wind power (Texas is the number-one wind-energy generating state in the United States, primarily centered in windy West Texas), in 2007, TSTC Sweetwater created the first community college wind-energy program in Texas, and constructed a demonstration 2MW 60Hz DeWind D8.2 prototype wind turbine for student training.
Texas State Technical College has partnered with Pinnacle Career Institute in Kansas City to offer the wind turbine technician program.

References

External links
Official website

Buildings and structures in Harlingen, Texas
Education in Waco, Texas
Universities and colleges accredited by the Southern Association of Colleges and Schools
Education in McLennan County, Texas
Education in Cameron County, Texas
Education in Harrison County, Texas
Education in Taylor County, Texas
Education in Stephens County, Texas
Education in Brown County, Texas
Education in Nolan County, Texas
Community colleges in Texas
Technological universities in the United States